Claus Wilcke (born 12 August 1939, in Bremen) is a German actor who has played Americans in the German TV shows Percy Stuart and I.O.B. Spezialauftrag. He has also dubbed many American actors including Elvis Presley and Michael Landon for cinema and TV. He has won several German awards.

Career
Wilcke started as a stage actor. He passed a complete classic training and graduated. He was trained for stunts in London and played many sports such as fencing and riding. In 1958, he appeared for the first time on the big screen. After 20 feature films and three guest appearances in Jason King, he was cast for Percy Stuart. Nearly all of his stunts were done by himself because the insurance companies back then didn't hinder him.

Later Wilcke played roles in numerous other German TV shows and on very many theatre stages all over Germany. He is also a very sought-after voice-over actor. In 2012, he had a cameo appearance in Iron Sky where he is the white-bearded politician at the international conference who repeatedly laughs at the fictitious president of the United States until he gets angry and throws a shoe at her.

Personal life
Wilcke is married and has two children, Nicolas and Alexandra.

Selected filmography
 My Ninety Nine Brides (1958)
 Love Now, Pay Later (1959)
 Crime After School (1959)
 The Day the Rains Came (1959)
 Stage Fright (1960)
 Mit 17 weint man nicht (1960)
 Via Mala (1961)
 Freddy and the Millionaire (1961)
 Café Oriental (1962)
 When Ludwig Goes on Manoeuvres (1967)
 Percy Stuart (1969–1972, TV series)
 I.O.B. Spezialauftrag (1980–1981, TV series)
 Sylter Geschichten (1993–1995, TV series)
 Verbotene Liebe (2011–2012, TV series)
 Iron Sky (2012)
 Unter uns (2018–2019, TV series)

References

External links

Claus Wilcke's filmography as voice-over actor
Claus Wilcke on steffi-line.de
Claus Wilcke interview (German)
Claus Wilcke's homepage (archived)

1939 births
Living people
Businesspeople from Bremen
German male film actors
German male television actors
German male voice actors
20th-century German male actors
21st-century German male actors